The 2007 Sunshine Tour was the eighth season of professional golf tournaments since the southern Africa based Sunshine Tour was rebranded in 2000, and the marked the beginning of a new era as the tour switched to a calendar based season, having previously been seasonal. The Sunshine Tour represents the highest level of competition for male professional golfers in the region.

The tour was based predominantly in South Africa, with 24 of the 28 tournaments being held in the country. Two events were held in Swaziland, with one each in Zambia and Namibia. There were five new tournaments, the Joburg Open, one of three events co-sanctioned by the PGA European Tour, the Nashua Golf Challenge, the Lombard Insurance Classic, the returning Mount Edgecombe Trophy, and the Nedbank Affinity Cup, introduced to the schedule as an appetizer to the high profile Nedbank Golf Challenge.

As usual, the tour consisted of two distinct parts, commonly referred to as the "Summer Swing" and "Winter Swing". Tournaments held during the Summer Swing generally had much higher prize funds, attracted stronger fields, and were the only tournaments on the tour to carry world ranking points, with three events being co-sanctioned with the European Tour.

The Winter Swing ran from March to November, starting with the Mount Edgecombe Trophy, and closing with the Coca-Cola Charity Championship. Since the tour switched to a calendar based season, this part of the tour effectively splits the Summer Swing into two, with five events being held at the start of the year, and the remainder in December. Due to these scheduling changes, the first five events of the 2007 season had already been part of the 2006–07 tour schedule, but continued to count towards the final standings of both.

The Order of Merit was won for the first time by James Kingston, breaking Charl Schwartzel's three year stranglehold on the title.

Schedule
The following table lists official events during the 2007 season.

Order of Merit
The Order of Merit was based on prize money won during the season, calculated in South African rand.

Ernie Els was the fifth highest money winner (with R1,120,503.20) but did not qualify for the Order of Merit, having only played in three events. John Bickerton and Ariel Cañete were second and fourth respectively in the money list thanks to their victories in the Alfred Dunhill Championship and the Joburg Open, but as non tour members, and having not entered sufficient events, they were also ineligible for the Order of Merit.

Notes

References

External links

Sunshine Tour
Sunshine Tour